Archimantis vittata is a species of praying mantis in the family Mantidae.  It is found in Australia.

See also
List of mantis genera and species

References

Archimantis
Insects described in 1997
Endemic fauna of Australia